In geometry, the order-4 apeirogonal tiling is a regular tiling of the hyperbolic plane. It has Schläfli symbol of {∞,4}.

Symmetry
This tiling represents the mirror lines of *2∞ symmetry. It dual to this tiling represents the fundamental domains of orbifold notation *∞∞∞∞ symmetry, a square domain with four ideal vertices.

Uniform colorings 
Like the Euclidean square tiling there are 9 uniform colorings for this tiling, with 3 uniform colorings generated by triangle reflective domains. A fourth can be constructed from an infinite square symmetry (*∞∞∞∞) with 4 colors around a vertex. The checker board, r{∞,∞}, coloring defines the fundamental domains of [(∞,4,4)], (*∞44) symmetry, usually shown as black and white domains of reflective orientations.

Related polyhedra and tiling 

This tiling is also topologically related as a part of sequence of regular polyhedra and tilings with four faces per vertex, starting with the octahedron, with Schläfli symbol {n,4}, and Coxeter diagram , with n progressing to infinity.

See also

Tilings of regular polygons
List of uniform planar tilings
List of regular polytopes

References
 John H. Conway, Heidi Burgiel, Chaim Goodman-Strass, The Symmetries of Things 2008,  (Chapter 19, The Hyperbolic Archimedean Tessellations)

External links 

 Hyperbolic and Spherical Tiling Gallery
 KaleidoTile 3: Educational software to create spherical, planar and hyperbolic tilings
 Hyperbolic Planar Tessellations, Don Hatch

Apeirogonal tilings
Hyperbolic tilings
Isogonal tilings
Isohedral tilings
Order-4 tilings
Regular tilings